Peter J. Panuthos (born 1943 in New York City) a special trial judge of the United States Tax Court.

Education
Panuthos attended public schools in New York City and graduated from Erasmus Hall High School in 1961.  He attended Bernard Baruch School of Business of CUNY, and received a B.S. from Bryant College in 1966.  He attended law school at Suffolk University, where he received a J.D. in 1969.  He also received an LL.M. in taxation from Boston University School of Law in 1972.

Career
From 1970 to 1983, Panuthos was a trial attorney and assistant district counsel at the Boston Office of Chief Counsel of the Internal Revenue Service. He was appointed a Special Trial Judge of the United States Tax Court on June 12, 1983.  He has also taught tax procedure and substantive tax courses as an adjunct professor at Bentley College, The Catholic University of America, Columbus School of Law, and the David A. Clarke School of Law, University of District of Columbia.  He has served as Chief Special Trial Judge from June 1, 1992.

References
Material on this page was adapted from the website of the United States Tax Court, which is published by a United States government agency and is therefore in the public domain.

1943 births
Special trial judges of the United States Tax Court
Living people
Boston University School of Law alumni
Suffolk University Law School alumni
Baruch College alumni
Bryant University alumni
Columbus School of Law faculty
David A. Clarke School of Law faculty
Erasmus Hall High School alumni